The King Khalid Sport City Stadium, previously known as the King Khalid Sport City Stadium, is a football stadium in Tabuk, Saudi Arabia.  It is used mainly for football The stadium has a seating capacity of 12,000 spectators.

See also
 List of things named after Saudi Kings

References

External links
Stadium information

Football venues in Saudi Arabia
Tabuk, Saudi Arabia